

This schema, or explanatory outline, for the novel Ulysses was produced by its author, James Joyce in 1920 in order to help a friend (Carlo Linati) understand the fundamental structure of the book. The schema has been split into two tables for better ease of reading.

See also
 Gilbert schema for Ulysses

Notes

References

External links
 Internet Ulysses

Ulysses (novel)